Arena Jaskółka Tarnów is an arena in Tarnów, Poland.  It is primarily used for handball and basketball. Hala Unii holds 4,317 people and hosts the home games of SPR Tarnów and Unia Tarnów.

References

Indoor arenas in Poland
Sports venues in Lesser Poland Voivodeship
Buildings and structures in Tarnów
Handball venues in Poland
Basketball venues in Poland
Boxing venues in Poland
Mixed martial arts venues in Poland